Goodenia pumilio is a species of flowering plant in the family Goodeniaceae and is native to northern Australia and New Guinea. It is a prostrate, stolon-forming herb with egg-shaped to lance-shaped leaves in rosettes, and racemes of small, dark reddish-purple flowers.

Description

Taxonomy and naming
Goodenia pumilio was first formally described in 1810 by Robert Brown in his Prodromus Florae Novae Hollandiae et Insulae Van Diemen. The specific epithet (pumilio) means "dwarf".

Distribution and habitat
This goodenia grows in marshes and swamps in the Kimberley region of Western Australia, northern parts of the Northern Territory and Queensland and in New Guinea.

References

pumilio
Eudicots of Western Australia
Flora of Queensland
Flora of the Northern Territory
Flora of New Guinea
Plants described in 1810
Taxa named by Robert Brown (botanist, born 1773)